Sorbus scalaris is a species of rowan. It is native to western Sichuan and Yunnan in China where it grows in mixed forests on mountain slopes at altitudes of 1600–3000 m. S. scalaris is a shrub or small tree, 3–7 m tall.

Sorbus scalaris is sometimes cultivated. It said to be the most attractive small tree among the orange-fruited Rowan species. Because it is self-incompatible and very few clones are cultivated, most seedlings raised from this species by gardeners are hybrids.

References 

scalaris
Endemic flora of China
Trees of China